The 2018 Inter-Provincial Trophy was the sixth edition of the Inter-Provincial Trophy, a Twenty20 cricket competition that was played in Ireland. It was held from 18 May to 8 July 2018. It was the second edition of the competition to be played with full Twenty20 status. Leinster Lightning were the defending champions. They won the tournament, with five wins from their six matches.

Points table
The following teams competed:

Fixtures
As with the Inter-Provincial Championship, and Inter-Provincial Cup, the Inter-Provincial Trophy, Ireland's national T20 provincial competition, operated as a home and away round robin. Unlike the previous two competitions, however, a fourth provincial team, Munster Reds took part, meaning each team had six fixtures in total. The first six fixtures took place across three matchdays, while the second six fixtures were held together in a single venue across three days, to form an Inter-Provincial T20 Festival.

Round 1

Round 2

Round 3

Round 4

Round 5

Round 6

References

External links
 Series home at ESPN Cricinfo

Inter
Inter-Provincial Trophy seasons